is a passenger railway station located in the town of Kaisei, Ashigarakami District, Kanagawa Prefecture, Japan.  The station operated by the Odakyu Electric Railway.

Lines
Kaisei Station is served by the Odakyu Odawara Line and is 74.3 kilometers from the line’s terminal at Shinjuku Station.

Station layout
Kaisei Station has two opposed side platforms with two tracks. The station building is built on a cantilevered structure above and to a right angle with the platforms and tracks. An Odakyū 3100 series NSE railcar is preserved in the park outside the east exit of the station .

Platforms

History
Kaisei Station was opened on 4 March 1985 with normal and 6-car limited express services.

Station numbering was introduced in January 2014 with Kaisei being assigned station number OH42.

Passenger statistics
In fiscal 2019, the station was used by an average of 12,350 passengers daily (boarding passengers only).

The passenger figures (boarding passengers only) for previous years are as shown below.

Bus services
 Hakone Tozan Bus
 for Sekimoto (Daiyuzan Station) via Wadagahara Station

Surrounding area
Kaisei Municipal Kaisei Minami Elementary School

See also
List of railway stations in Japan

References

External links

Official home page.

Railway stations in Japan opened in 1985
Odakyu Odawara Line
Railway stations in Kanagawa Prefecture
Kaisei, Kanagawa